Sant Andreu is a station of the Barcelona Metro network, served by line L1. Named after the neighbourhood of Sant Andreu de Palomar, in the Sant Andreu district of the city, the station was built in 1968 along with Fabra i Puig and Torras i Bages. It's interconnected with nearby railway station Sant Andreu Comtal.

Services

See also
Sant Andreu Comtal railway station
Plaça d'Orfila

External links

Trenscat.com

Railway stations in Spain opened in 1968
Barcelona Metro line 1 stations
Transport in Sant Andreu